Othenio Lothar Franz Anton Louis Abel (June 20, 1875 – July 4, 1946) was an Austrian paleontologist and evolutionary biologist. Together with Louis Dollo, he was the founder of "paleobiology" and studied the life and environment of fossilized organisms.

Life 
Abel was born in Vienna, the son of the architect Lothar Abel. Abel earned a PhD, after studying both law and science, from the University of Vienna. He remained there as an assistant to Alpine geologist Eduard Suess, before being appointed a professor of paleontology. Three years later, he finished his habilitation thesis as a paleontologist at the University of Vienna. From 1900 to 1907, he worked at the Geologische Reichsanstalt.

In 1907, Abel became an extraordinary professor in Vienna, and from 1917 to 1934 he was a regular professor of paleontology in Vienna. As such, he led several expeditions that gave him broad recognition, such as the Pikermi-expedition to Greece in 1912, an American expedition (1925) and one to South Africa (1929).

Abel became a member of the Leopoldina academy in 1935. From 1935 to 1940, he was a professor at Göttingen University, after which he was retired, age 61. In 1942, he was appointed an honorary member of the Paläontologische Gesellschaft.

Scientific activity 
Abel mainly studied fossil vertebrates. He was a supporter of Neo-Lamarckist evolution. His main contribution to the field, however, was the formulation, together with Louis Dollo, of paleobiology, which combines the methods and findings of the natural science biology with the methods and findings of the earth science paleontology. From 1928 onwards, Othenio Abel was the publisher of a journal dedicated to paleobiology, Paläobiologica.

In 1914, Abel proposed that fossil dwarf elephants inspired the myth of giant Cyclopes, because the center nasal opening was thought to be a cyclopic eye socket. In 1920 he was awarded the Daniel Giraud Elliot Medal from the National Academy of Sciences. He also showed great interest in cave bear remains at the so-called "Dragon's Cave" near Mixnitz.

Abel was an advocate of orthogenesis, he believed that there were trends in evolution that were internally programmed.

Political attitude and National Socialism 
Already as a student, Abel took part in anti-semitic riots at the University of Vienna, during the Badeni-crisis of 1897. After the First World War, now a professor, he gave voice to his fear of a power takeover by "Communists, Social Democrats and Jews and more Jews tied to both". As the journalist Klaus Taschwer publicized in 2012, Abel was responsible for the founding of a secret group of 18 professors that sought to frustrate the research and careers of left-wing and Jewish scientists. The rise in violence of National Socialist student groups towards Jewish students in 1934 were met with sympathy by Abel. When such attacks began to be directed at Catholic and international students as well, Abel, now the university rector, was forced into early retirement by the Austrofascist board. This caused him to emigrate to Germany and accept the post in Göttingen.

He visited Vienna again in 1939, after the Anschluss with Nazi Germany. After seeing how the Nazi flag was shown at the university building, he pronounced this the "Happiest moment of his life".  The new regime honored him with the newly created post of "Honorary Senator" of the University - an honour that was rescinded after the Second World War, in 1945. A letter of recommendation for the Goethe Prize points out how Abel had always "fought in the first line" against the "Judaification" of the University. After the war, he was once again forced into retirement along with other prominent Nazi professors and spent his last days in Mondsee, then known as something of a "Nazi colony".

Selected writings
 Einige Monstrositäten bei Orchideenblüthen (1897)
 Ueber einige Ophrydeen (1898)
 Les dauphins longirostres du boldérien (miocène supérieur) des environs d'Anvers. Brussels 1901 - 1931 doi:10.5962/bhl.title.16053
 Les odontocètes du Boldérien (miocène supérieur) d'Anvers. Brüssel 1905 doi:10.5962/bhl.title.15923
 Fossile Flugfische (1906)
 "Neuere Anschauungen über den Bau und die Lebensweise der Dinosaurier." Berichte der Sektion für Paläozoologie 16. Dezemb (1908): 117–22.
 Die Morphologie der Hüftbeinrudimente der Cetaceen. Vienna 1907 doi:10.5962/bhl.title.16064
 "Die Rekonstruktion des Diplodocus." Abhandlungen der K.K. Zoologisch-botanischen Gesellschaft in Wien 5 (1910).
 "Über die allgemeinen Prinzipien der paläontologischen Rekonstruktion." 'Verhandlungen der zoologisch-botanische Gesellschaft zu Wien LX (1910): 141–46.
 "Die Vorfahren der Vögel und ihre Lebensweise." Verhandlungen der zoologisch-botanische Gesellschaft zu Wien LXI (1911): 144–91.
 Grundzüge der Paläobiologie der Wirbeltiere. Stuttgart 1912 doi:10.5962/bhl.title.61833
 Vorzeitliche Säugetiere. Jena 1914
 Die Tiere Der Vorwelt. Leipzig & Berlin 1914.
 Die Paläontologie in Forschung und Lehre. Naturwissenschaften 3 (1915), 413-19 
 Paläobiologie der Cephalopoden aus der Gruppe der Dibranchiaten Jena 1916. doi:10.5962/bhl.title.46089
 Die Stämme der Wirbeltiere. Berlin, Leipzig, 1919 doi:10.5962/bhl.title.2114
 Lehrbuch der Paläozoologie. Jena 1920
 Lebensbilder aus der Tierwelt der Vorzeit. Jena 1921 doi:10.5962/bhl.title.61701
 Geschichte und Methode der Rekonstruktion vorzeitlicher Wirbeltiere. Jena 1925
 Paläobiologie und Stammesgeschichte". Jena 1929
 Die Stellung des Menschen im Rahmen der Wirbeltiere. 1931
 Vorzeitliche Lebensspuren. Jena 1935
 Die Tiere der Vorzeit in ihrem Lebensraum. Jena 1939
 Vorzeitliche Tierreste im Deutschen Mythus, Brauchtum und Volksglauben. Jena 1939

References

Further reading
 Baumgartel, Hans. "Abel, Othenio." in Dictionary of Scientific Biography. (1970). New York: Charles Scribner's Sons. Vol. 1: p. 17-18.
 Ute Deichmann: Biologen unter Hitler. Porträt einer Wissenschaft im NS-Staat. Frankfurt: Fischer, 1995. 
 
 "Abel, Othenio." in Taxonomic Literature II Online.'' (n.d.). Smithsonian Institution Libraries.

1875 births
1946 deaths
Austrian paleontologists
Corresponding Members of the USSR Academy of Sciences
Orthogenesis
Paleobiologists
Nazi Party members
Members of the German Academy of Sciences Leopoldina
Members of the Göttingen Academy of Sciences and Humanities
Austro-Hungarian scientists